Soekidjan Irodikromo (20 June 1945 – 18 August 2020) was a Surinamese painter and ceramics artist. He was born in Plantage Pieterszorg, Commewijne District. Along with Erwin de Vries, Ruben Karsters, Rudi de la Fuente, and Paul Woei, he was one of a number of Surinamese artists to have emerged during the 1960s.  Stylistically, his work owes a good deal to the COBRA movement, and uses themes from Javanese mythology.

References
 Chandra van Binnendijk (ed.), Soeki Irodikromo, beeldend kunstenaar/Visual artist. Paramaribo: Vereniging Herdenking Javaanse Immigratie in Suriname, [2005].
Biography and CV at Readytex Gallery

1945 births
2020 deaths
People from Commewijne District
Surinamese people of Javanese descent
Surinamese painters